David Leigh Kerr (25 March 1923 – 12 January 2009) was a Labour Party politician in the United Kingdom.

Kerr stood unsuccessfully for Streatham in the 1959 general election. He was elected Member of Parliament (MP) for Wandsworth Central from 1964 to 1970, when he stood down. A general practitioner before and after his period in parliament, he was active in the Socialist Medical Association as honorary secretary (1957–63) and then vice-president (1963–72).

He later served as a County Councillor in Welwyn Garden City, Hertfordshire retiring from that role in 2001.

References

1923 births
2009 deaths
Labour Party (UK) MPs for English constituencies
UK MPs 1964–1966
UK MPs 1966–1970
English Jews
Councillors in Hertfordshire
Members of London County Council
Jewish British politicians
People educated at Whitgift School